Niina Mäkinen (born 18 April 1992) is a Finnish ice hockey forward, most recently of Oulun Kärpät Naiset during the 2019–20 Naisten Liiga season. She competed with the Finnish national team and participated in the IIHF World Women's Championship in 2011, 2013 and 2015.

References

External links

1992 births
Living people
Finnish women's ice hockey forwards
Oulun Kärpät Naiset players
Team Kuortane players
Cats Jyväskylä players
Sportspeople from Central Finland